The Steinheim crater is a meteorite crater in Steinheim am Albuch, Heidenheim County, Baden-Württemberg, Germany. The crater is located at the north-eastern end of the Swabian Alb, 40km west of the much larger (24-km-diameter) Nördlinger Ries crater.

It is 3.8 km in diameter and the age is estimated to be about 14.3 million years (Miocene). The crater is exposed at the surface. It had previously been thought that the two craters formed simultaneously by the impact of a double asteroid 14.8 million years ago, but a study published in 2020 suggests that Steinheim could actually be about 500,000 years younger than Nördlinger Ries.

References

 J. Baier, V. J. Sach: Shatter-Cones aus den Impaktkratern Nördlinger Ries und Steinheimer Becken. In: Fossilien, 35(2), Wiebelsheim 2018.
 V. J. Sach & J. Baier: Neue Untersuchungen an Strahlenkalken und Shatter-Cones in Sediment- und Kristallingesteinen (Ries-Impakt und Steinheim-Impakt, Deutschland). Pfeil-Verlag, München 2017. .

Impact craters of Germany
Miocene impact craters
Landforms of Baden-Württemberg
South German Scarplands
Basins of Germany
Heidenheim (district)